Polyipnus kiwiensis, commonly known as the kiwi hatchetfish, is a species of ray-finned fish in the genus Polyipnus. They live in the Tasman Sea off Australia and New Zealand. They are carnivores.

References

Sternoptychidae